Barbara Kellerman is an American professor of public leadership, currently at Harvard University's John F. Kennedy School of Government. Previously, she was a professor at Fordham, Tufts, Fairleigh Dickinson, George Washington, and Uppsala universities and Dartmouth College. She was one of the founders of the International Leadership Association.

Kellerman ranked by Forbes.com as among "Top 50 Business Thinkers" 2009, and ranked by Leadership Excellence as in Top 15 "Best Minds on Leadership" 2008-2009.

Biography 
Kellerman received her B.A from Sarah Lawrence College, and her M.A. (Russian and East European Studies), M.Phil., and Ph.D. (Political Science) degrees from Yale University. She was awarded a Danforth Fellowship and three Fulbright fellowships.

In addition to the above-named professorships, Kellerman served as Dean of Graduate Studies and Research at Fairleigh Dickinson (1987–90); held the Fulbright Chair in American Studies at Uppsala (1996–97); was Director of the Center for the Advanced Study of Leadership at the Academy of Leadership at the University of Maryland (1997–2000); served as Founding Executive Director of the Kennedy School’s Center for Public Leadership (2000 to 2003); and as the Center’s Research Director from 2003-2006. She was also cofounder of the International Leadership Association (ILA), which now has more than 2,600 members in over 70 countries worldwide.

Kellerman has received the Wilbur M. McFeely Award, National Management Association, 2010 "for outstanding contributions" to the fields of leadership and management

Work 
In recent years Kellerman has become as interested in followership as in leadership; as interested in bad leadership as in good leadership; and as interested in how women lead as in how men lead. Her approach to leadership and followership is interdisciplinary/multidisciplinary. And, instead of being primarily practice-based, it is in the venerable tradition of the liberal arts.

Kellerman has appeared often on media outlets such as CBS, NBC, PBS, CNN, NPR, Reuters and BBC, and she has contributed articles and reviews to the New York Times, Washington Post, Boston Globe, Los Angeles Times, and Harvard Business Review. Her blogs have appeared primarily on web sites such as Harvard Business Review and Washington Post.

In recent years she has given talks in Berlin, London, Moscow, Rome, São Paulo, Shanghai, Zurich, Jerusalem, Turin, Toronto, and Montreal. She is on the Advisory Board of the Leadership Research Network, on the Advisory Panel of the White House Leadership Project Report, on the editorial Board of Leadership Quarterly, and on the Publications Committee of the International Leadership Association.

Selected bibliography
Professionalizing Leadership, Oxford University Press, 2018
The End of Leadership, HarperBusiness 2012
Leadership: Essential Selections on Power, Authority, and Influence (Editor)
Followership: How Followers Are Creating Change and Changing Leaders
Women & Leadership: The State of Play and Strategies for Change
Bad Leadership: What It Is, How It Happens, Why It Matters
Reinventing Leadership: Making the Connection between Politics and Business
Cutting Edge: Leadership 2000, coeditor with Larraine Matusak and contributor
The President as World Leader, with Ryan Barilleux.
Leadership and Negotiation in the Middle East, coeditor with Jeffrey Rubin, and contributor    
Political Leadership: A Source Book, editor
Women Leaders in American Politics, coeditor with James David Barber
The Political Presidency: Practice of Leadership
Leadership: Multidisciplinary Perspectives, editor and contributor
All the Presidents Kin: Their Political Roles
Making Decisions, with Percy Hill et al.

References

External links 

 Harvard Kennedy School Directory 
 Barbara Kellerman Home Page

Harvard Kennedy School faculty
Living people
Fordham University faculty
Tufts University faculty
Fairleigh Dickinson University faculty
George Washington University faculty
Academic staff of Uppsala University
Sarah Lawrence College alumni
Yale University alumni
Leadership scholars
Year of birth missing (living people)